Notoreas is a genus of geometer moths endemic to New Zealand. The genus was described by Edward Meyrick in 1885.

Species
Species include:

Notoreas arcuata
Notoreas atmogramma
Notoreas blax
Notoreas casanova
Notoreas chioneres
Notoreas chrysopeda
Notoreas edwardsi
Notoreas elegans
Notoreas galaxias
Notoreas hexaleuca
Notoreas ischnocyma
Notoreas isoleuca
Notoreas isomoera
Notoreas mechanitis
Notoreas niphocrena
Notoreas ortholeuca
Notoreas paradelpha
Notoreas perornata
Notoreas simplex

References

External links

 Notoreas moths discussed on Radio New Zealand's Critter of the Week, 7 December 2018

Hydriomenini
Endemic fauna of New Zealand
Taxa named by Edward Meyrick
Endemic moths of New Zealand